Peter Best is an Australian composer who has created or contributed to many film scores.

His career started in 1967.

In 1969, the founders of Producers Authors Composers and Talent (now PACT Centre for Emerging Artists) attended a Sydney University Architecture Revue, with sets by Geoffrey Atherden and Grahame Bond, and invited Bond, Atherden,Peter Weir, and Best a chance to do a show at the National Art School. Sir Robert Helpmann saw the show and  took it to the Adelaide Festival, and soon afterwards Weir and Bond were commissioned to write a Christmas special TV show for ABC Television, called Man on a Green Bike.

He has worked on such films as The Adventures of Barry McKenzie (1972), Barry McKenzie Holds His Own (1974), End Play (1976), The Picture Show Man (1977), We of the Never Never (1982), Goodbye Paradise (1983), Bliss (1985), Crocodile Dundee (1986), Crocodile Dundee II (1988), Muriel's Wedding (1994), Doing Time for Patsy Cline (1997) and My Mother Frank (2000).

Many of his scores have been released on compact disc, including Crocodile Dundee on Varèse Sarabande, and We of the Never Never on 1M1 Records.

He was also responsible for the theme music for the Life. Be in it, 
Care For Kids (International Year of the Child 1979), Slip Slop Slap (Cancer Council Victoria), and Rosella (Only the Best to You).

Awards

ARIA Music Awards
The ARIA Music Awards is an annual awards ceremony that recognises excellence, innovation, and achievement across all genres of Australian music. They commenced in 1987. 

! 
|-
| 1987
| "Crocodile" Dundee
| Best Original Soundtrack, Cast or Show Album
| 
| 
|-

Australian Film Institute Award for Best Original Music Score
1977 – The Picture Show Man
1985 – Rebel: Original Motion Picture Soundtrack with Ray Cook, Chris Neal, Billy Byers, Bruce Rowland 
1995 – Dad and Dave: On Our Selection
1997 – Doing Time for Patsy Cline

References

External links

 

APRA Award winners
Australian film score composers
Male film score composers
Living people
1943 births
20th-century composers
20th-century Australian male musicians
20th-century Australian musicians